Ravnik pri Hotedršici is a small village southeast of Hotedršica in the Municipality of Logatec in the Inner Carniola region of Slovenia.

Name
The name of the settlement was changed from Ravnik to Ravnik pri Hotedršici in 1955.

Church
The local church is dedicated to Saint Barbara and belongs to the Parish of Hotedršica. It is an old pilgrimage church and has the remains of a defence wall against Ottoman raids in the 15th century.

References

External links
Ravnik pri Hotedršici on Geopedia

Populated places in the Municipality of Logatec